2-MAPB is a recreational designer drug with empathogenic effects. As with other related substituted benzofuran derivatives such as 6-APB and 5-MAPB, 2-MAPB is a monoamine releaser with some selectivity for serotonin release, generally similar in pharmacological profile to MDMA but with greater activity as a directly acting agonist of 5-HT2 receptor subtypes and somewhat greater toxicity. 2-MAPB has been isolated from post-mortem toxicology screens in several drug-related fatal adverse reactions but generally only as a component of combinations of drugs, making it difficult to determine how much it contributed to the deaths. It is illegal in Japan.

See also 
 Benzofuranylpropylaminopentane
 Dimemebfe
 5-Methylmethiopropamine
 Methamnetamine

References 

Designer drugs
Entactogens and empathogens
Benzofuranethanamines
Secondary amines